The Lebanon School in the small community of Lebanon in Montezuma County, Colorado, about  north of Cortez and in the general area of Dolores, was built in 1907 and expanded in 1916.  It was listed on the National Register of Historic Places in 1996.

The listing included two contributing buildings and a contributing structure.

References

		
National Register of Historic Places in Montezuma County, Colorado

School buildings completed in 1916
1916 establishments in Colorado